The Jálama is a  mountain in western Spain.

Etymology 
In the local language of the northwestern Province of Cáceres, the mountain is known as Xálima. Both names probably come from Paleohispanic languages. The Jálama Valley is home to a Galician-like language, known as Fala.

Geography 
The mountain is located on the border between the provinces of Cáceres (autonomous community of Extremadura) and Salamanca (Castile and León). It is one of the highest peaks of the mountain range named Serra de Xálima. Its summit offers a good view of Salamanca's upland.

Around 3 km NE from the summit, the Arroyo de la Cervigona waters create a 60 m waterfall, the highest in the area.

Access to the summit 
The summit can be accessed from Acebo, through the Mirador de La Ventosa (794 m) and the mountain pass of Puerto de Perales.

See also

Sistema Central

References

External links
  MTB route to Jálama

Sistema Central
Mountains of Castile and León
Mountains of Extremadura
Geography of the Province of Salamanca
Geography of the Province of Cáceres
One-thousanders of Spain